The  was a DC electric multiple unit (EMU) rubber-tyred metro train type operated by Sapporo Municipal Subway on the Tōzai Line in the city of Sapporo, Japan, from June 1976 to August 2008.

Design
The trains are built by Kawasaki Heavy Industries and use chopper control with a reverse conducting thyristor. The 8300 series cars that were inserted later used a variable-frequency drive, provided by either Mitsubishi or Hitachi. Due to the use of both chopper-controlled and variable frequency drive-controlled cars in the 6000 series, this gave the 6000 series a unique sound on propulsion.

Formations
The 6000 series trains are formed as seven-car sets as shown below.

Interior
Passenger accommodation consists of longitudinal bench seating throughout, with a wheelchair space in each car. The 8300 series cars that were introduced later have an interior that is very similar to that of the 8000 series cars.

History
The first prototype cars were manufactured in 1975, and had a shape remarkably similar to that of the older 2000 series, followed by 20 more full-production sets in 1976. The trains began operation on 10 June 1976 with the opening of the stretch between Kotoni Station and Shiroishi Station and originally operated as four-car sets; however, when the stretch between Shiraishi and Shin-Sapporo Station opened on 21 March 1982, four more sets were delivered, this time as six-car sets, with the rest of the 4-car sets having additional cars added to make up a 6-car consist.

A seventh car known as the 8300 series was added to all sets starting from March 1999; the 8300 series were designed as such so that they could continue to be useful even when the 6000 series was completely withdrawn. This would prove true as the 6000 series would slowly be retired from 2002 onwards, as the new 8000 series cars began to replace them. The last remaining set, 6116, remained in service until 30 August 2008, after which it was retired. The 8300 series cars were later modified and fitted into various 8000 series sets and are still being used today.

The 6000 series was one of the two recipients of the 1977 Laurel Prize.

References

External links

This article incorporates information from the corresponding article on the Japanese Wikipedia.

Electric multiple units of Japan
Sapporo Municipal Subway
Kawasaki multiple units
Train-related introductions in 1976
1500 V DC multiple units of Japan